"Cut the Kid" is a song by French DJ and record producer Madeon. He described it as "kind of a happy groovy production jam". It was released as a free download in February 2014 through Madeon's website. Madeon claims to have created it in 2011 or 2012. "Cut the Kid" was accessed via a puzzle, which the user had to complete before receiving the download. The song features on the deluxe edition of his debut studio album, Adventure (2015).

References

External links
 "Cut the Kid" on SoundCloud

2014 singles
2014 songs
Madeon songs
Song recordings produced by Madeon
Songs written by Madeon